Orestes Demóstenes Homero•Quintana y Vigo (1880 – 4 April 1909) was a Spanish rower. He competed in the men's coxed four event at the 1900 Summer Olympics.

References

External links

1880 births
1909 deaths
Spanish male rowers
Olympic rowers of Spain
Rowers at the 1900 Summer Olympics
Rowers from Barcelona
Real Club Marítimo de Barcelona rowers
Date of birth missing
20th-century deaths from tuberculosis
Tuberculosis deaths in Spain